Darrin Van Horn (born September 7, 1968) is an American former professional boxer. He held the IBF Super Middleweight title from 1991 until 1992, as well as the IBF Junior Middleweight title from 1989 until 1990.

Professional boxing career
Van Horn boxed as an amateur for four years, winning Golden Gloves and Junior Olympic titles. With his father as his manager and trainer, he made his professional debut in New Orleans, Louisiana, on September 2, 1984. Van Horn was just five days short of his 16th birthday.

Since Van Horn was still a high school student when he turned professional, he was given the nickname "Schoolboy." In 1986, he moved to Lexington, Kentucky, to attend the University of Kentucky where he became a member of the Sigma Chi Fraternity. Boxing with the letters "UK" on his trunks, the "Schoolboy" angle was played up heavily.
 
He compiled a record of 38-0 before challenging for a world title. Van Horn, a 2-1 underdog, defeated Robert Hines by a 12-round unanimous decision to win the IBF Junior Middleweight Championship on February 5, 1989, in Atlantic City, New Jersey. On July 15, 1989, Van Horn returned to Atlantic City to make his first title defense against Gianfranco Rosi, the former WBC Super Welterweight Champion. Rosi, a decided underdog, took the title by winning by a 12-round unanimous decision.

After five consecutive wins, Van Horn had a rematch with Rosi in Italy on July 21, 1990. Although Van Horn fought better than he did in the first fight against Rosi, he was unable to regain the title. Rosi once again won by a 12-round unanimous decision.

Van Horn moved up in weight and won the IBF Super Middleweight Championship with an 11th-round knockout of Lindell Holmes in Italy on May 18, 1991. In his first title defense, he scored a third-round knockout of mandatory challenger John Jarvis in Irvine, California, on August 17, 1991.

On January 10, 1992, Van Horn lost the title to Iran Barkley, the former WBC Middleweight Champion, by a second-round technical knockout in New York City. Barkley, a 2-1 underdog, wobbled Van Horn with a left hook early in the first round and floored him three times in the second.

In May 1992, Van Horn graduated from the University of Kentucky with a bachelor's degree in broadcast journalism.

Van Horn was scheduled to face James Toney for the IBF Super Middleweight Championship in Tulsa, Oklahoma, on October 29, 1993, but he pulled out of the fight after claiming a shoulder injury. The Boston Globe reported: "Sadly, word around boxing says his real problem has been near-constant headaches that recently forced him to stay in a darkened room for days at a time." The Van Horn camp denied that was true, but one fight figure was quoted as saying: "It would be child abuse for his father to put him back in the ring. When I was with him, he knew me and why I was there, but every 15 or 20 minutes he'd ask, 'Why are you guys here?' It's pretty sad."

Van Horn was scheduled to face Nigel Benn for the WBC Super Middleweight Championship in England on September 10, 1994, but the fight was called off. According to Boxing Monthly, it was cancelled after Van Horn failed a brain scan. However, during an interview with Boxing News in 2015, Van Horn said: "I never failed any scan, not ever. I have no idea where that came from. I fought a few times after the Barkley fight. Rumors and things come up, it's just ridiculous. I just became disenchanted with the sport. I said to myself I was going to step back for a while and get a few things done; like going back to college, and my intention was to come back to boxing. But I never did."

Retirement
Van Horn won his final six fights. His last bout took place in Harlingen, Texas, on August 3, 1994. He defeated journeyman Willie Bell by a second-round technical knockout.

After retiring from boxing, Van Horn became a state trooper.

Professional boxing record

|-
|align="center" colspan=8|53 Wins (29 knockouts, 24 decisions), 3 Losses (1 knockout, 2 decisions)
|-
| align="center" style="border-style: none none solid solid; background: #e3e3e3"|Result
| align="center" style="border-style: none none solid solid; background: #e3e3e3"|Record
| align="center" style="border-style: none none solid solid; background: #e3e3e3"|Opponent
| align="center" style="border-style: none none solid solid; background: #e3e3e3"|Type
| align="center" style="border-style: none none solid solid; background: #e3e3e3"|Round
| align="center" style="border-style: none none solid solid; background: #e3e3e3"|Date
| align="center" style="border-style: none none solid solid; background: #e3e3e3"|Location
| align="center" style="border-style: none none solid solid; background: #e3e3e3"|Notes
|-align=center
|Win
|
|align=left| Willie Ball
|TKO
|2
|03/08/1994
|align=left| Harlingen, Texas, United States
|align=left|
|-
|Win
|
|align=left| Ricky Thomas
|PTS
|10
|15/12/1992
|align=left| Foxwoods Resort Casino, Mashantucket, Connecticut, United States
|align=left|
|-
|Win
|
|align=left| Rollin "Chiller" Williams
|UD
|10
|16/10/1992
|align=left| Boise, Idaho, United States
|align=left|
|-
|Win
|
|align=left| Bill "Fireball" Bradley
|RTD
|2
|29/09/1992
|align=left| Bismarck Civic Center, Bismarck, North Dakota, United States
|align=left|
|-
|Win
|
|align=left| Martin Amarillas
|UD
|10
|04/09/1992
|align=left| Country Club, Reseda, California, United States
|align=left|
|-
|Win
|
|align=left| "Little" Nicky Walker
|UD
|10
|30/06/1992
|align=left| Pensacola Civic Center, Pensacola, Florida, United States
|align=left|
|-
|Loss
|
|align=left| Iran Barkley
|TKO
|2
|10/01/1992
|align=left| Paramount Theatre, New York City, United States
|align=left|
|-
|Win
|
|align=left| "Big" John Jarvis
|KO
|3
|17/08/1991
|align=left| Bren Events Center, Irvine, California, United States
|align=left|
|-
|Win
|
|align=left| Lindell Holmes
|KO
|11
|18/05/1991
|align=left| Palazzo Dello Sport, Verbania, Italy
|align=left|
|-
|Win
|
|align=left| "Very" Randy Williams
|PTS
|10
|28/12/1990
|align=left| Lexington, Kentucky, United States
|align=left|
|-
|Loss
|
|align=left| Gianfranco Rosi
|UD
|12
|21/07/1990
|align=left| Palazzo del Ghiaccio, Marino, Lazio, Italy
|align=left|
|-
|Win
|
|align=left| Jake Torrance
|PTS
|8
|14/04/1990
|align=left| Loew's Hotel, Monte Carlo, Monaco
|align=left|
|-
|Win
|
|align=left| Ruben Cortina
|KO
|1
|02/03/1990
|align=left| Jackson, Mississippi, United States
|align=left|
|-
|Win
|
|align=left| Salim Muhammad
|UD
|10
|09/10/1989
|align=left| Roy Wilkins Auditorium, Saint Louis, Missouri, United States
|align=left|
|-
|Win
|
|align=left| Mike Sacchetti
|PTS
|10
|25/09/1989
|align=left| Nogent-le-Phaye, France
|align=left|
|-
|Win
|
|align=left| Steve Langley
|PTS
|10
|13/09/1989
|align=left| Metairie, Louisiana, United States
|align=left|
|-
|Loss
|
|align=left| Gianfranco Rosi
|UD
|12
|15/07/1989
|align=left| Trump Castle, Atlantic City, New Jersey, United States
|align=left|
|-
|Win
|
|align=left| Robert "Bam Bam" Hines
|UD
|12
|05/02/1989
|align=left| Trump Castle, Atlantic City, New Jersey, United States
|align=left|
|-
|Win
|
|align=left| Miguel Angel Hernandez
|TKO
|5
|03/11/1988
|align=left| Showboat Hotel and Casino, Las Vegas, Nevada, United States
|align=left|
|-
|Win
|
|align=left| Jake Torrance
|UD
|10
|20/09/1988
|align=left| Memorial Coliseum, Lexington, Kentucky, United States
|align=left|
|-
|Win
|
|align=left| Juan Elizondo
|KO
|3
|05/05/1988
|align=left| Fairgrounds Stadium, Louisville, Kentucky, United States
|align=left|
|-
|Win
|
|align=left| John Munduga
|TKO
|7
|21/02/1988
|align=left| Hilton Hotel, Frankfort, Kentucky, United States
|align=left|
|-
|Win
|
|align=left| Joe "Indian" Summers
|UD
|10
|05/12/1987
|align=left| Atlantic City Convention Center, Atlantic City, New Jersey, United States
|align=left|
|-
|Win
|
|align=left| Juan Alonso Villa
|PTS
|10
|17/10/1987
|align=left| Harrah's Atlantic City, Atlantic City, New Jersey, United States
|align=left|98-92, 98-93, 99-91
|-
|Win
|
|align=left| Norberto Bueno
|KO
|3
|17/09/1987
|align=left| Felt Forum, New York City, United States
|align=left|
|-
|Win
|
|align=left| Greg "Tool Man" Taylor
|UD
|8
|25/08/1987
|align=left| Continental Inn, Lexington, Kentucky, United States
|align=left|
|-
|Win
|
|align=left| Luis Santana
|UD
|10
|21/06/1987
|align=left| Lexington, Kentucky, United States
|align=left|
|-
|Win
|
|align=left| Elio Diaz
|UD
|10
|20/04/1987
|align=left| Rupp Arena, Lexington, Kentucky, United States
|align=left|
|-
|Win
|
|align=left| John "Papa" Moore
|TKO
|6
|24/02/1987
|align=left| Continental Inn, Lexington, Kentucky, United States
|align=left|
|-
|Win
|
|align=left| "Dangerous" Danny Thomas
|PTS
|10
|13/01/1987
|align=left| Continental Inn, Lexington, Kentucky, United States
|align=left|
|-
|Win
|
|align=left| Sammy Floyd
|UD
|10
|09/09/1986
|align=left| Rupp Arena, Lexington, Kentucky, United States
|align=left|Floyd took the fight on short notice after Bruce Curry pulled out.
|-
|Win
|
|align=left| Keheven Johnson
|KO
|8
|01/07/1986
|align=left| Louisiana Superdome, New Orleans, Louisiana, United States
|align=left|
|-
|Win
|
|align=left| Donald Gwinn
|TKO
|5
|24/06/1986
|align=left| Continental Inn, Lexington, Kentucky, United States
|align=left|
|-
|Win
|
|align=left|David "Dexter" Ramsey
|KO
|4
|15/04/1986
|align=left| Lafayette, Louisiana, United States
|align=left|
|-
|Win
|
|align=left| Norberto Sabater
|TKO
|2
|06/03/1986
|align=left| Landmark Hotel, Metairie, Louisiana, United States
|align=left|
|-
|Win
|
|align=left| Ed Modicue
|UD
|8
|21/01/1986
|align=left| Landmark Hotel, Metairie, Louisiana, United States
|align=left|
|-
|Win
|
|align=left| Reggie Dixon
|PTS
|6
|15/10/1985
|align=left| Landmark Hotel, Metairie, Louisiana, United States
|align=left|
|-
|Win
|
|align=left|Javier Muniz
|KO
|5
|02/10/1985
|align=left| Houma, Louisiana, United States
|align=left|
|-
|Win
|
|align=left| Pablo Valdez
|TKO
|4
|17/09/1985
|align=left| Landmark Hotel, Metairie, Louisiana, United States
|align=left|
|-
|Win
|
|align=left| Earl White
|KO
|5
|06/09/1985
|align=left| Terrytown, Nebraska, United States
|align=left|
|-
|Win
|
|align=left| Robert "Hot Dog" Manous
|KO
|3
|11/07/1985
|align=left| Sports Palace, Morgan City, Louisiana, United States
|align=left|
|-
|Win
|
|align=left| Reggie Dixon
|UD
|6
|26/06/1985
|align=left| Lafayette, Louisiana, United States
|align=left|
|-
|Win
|
|align=left| Alonzo Stringfellow
|TKO
|1
|10/06/1985
|align=left| Landmark Hotel, Metairie, Louisiana, United States
|align=left|
|-
|Win
|
|align=left| John Wesley Morton
|SD
|6
|07/05/1985
|align=left| Landmark Hotel, Metairie, Louisiana, United States
|align=left|
|-
|Win
|
|align=left| Ronald Paige
|KO
|1
|18/04/1985
|align=left| Monroe, Louisiana, United States
|align=left|
|-
|Win
|
|align=left| James "Colonel" Sanders
|KO
|4
|20/03/1985
|align=left| Lafayette, Louisiana, United States
|align=left|
|-
|Win
|
|align=left| Derrick Earvin
|SD
|4
|07/03/1985
|align=left| Convention Hall, Gadsden, Alabama, United States
|align=left|
|-
|Win
|
|align=left|Jessie Hopkins
|KO
|1
|04/03/1985
|align=left| Landmark Hotel, Metairie, Louisiana, United States
|align=left|
|-
|Win
|
|align=left| "Little" Jimmy Mitchell
|TKO
|5
|21/02/1985
|align=left| Morgan City, Louisiana, United States
|align=left|
|-
|Win
|
|align=left|David "Barber" Seville
|KO
|2
|08/02/1985
|align=left| Lafayette, Louisiana, United States
|align=left|
|-
|Win
|
|align=left| Mike "The Spike" French
|TKO
|1
|16/01/1985
|align=left| Lafayette, Louisiana, United States
|align=left|
|-
|Win
|
|align=left|Jamie Hobbs
|KO
|1
|18/12/1984
|align=left| Morgan City, Louisiana, United States
|align=left|
|-
|Win
|
|align=left|Rodney "King" Jones
|KO
|2
|04/12/1984
|align=left| St Bernard Civic Auditorium, New Orleans, Louisiana, United States
|align=left|
|-
|Win
|
|align=left| Willie Rimmer
|PTS
|6
|20/11/1984
|align=left| Jefferson City, Missouri, United States
|align=left|
|-
|Win
|
|align=left| Richard "Zach" Morris
|TKO
|2
|13/11/1984
|align=left| Municipal Auditorium, Lafayette, Louisiana, United States
|align=left|
|-
|Win
|
|align=left| Leon Kerlinger
|KO
|2
|02/09/1984
|align=left| New Orleans, Louisiana, United States
|align=left|
|}

See also

 List of IBF world champions

References

External links

1968 births
Boxers from Kentucky
Boxers from Louisiana
International Boxing Federation champions
Living people
People from Morgan City, Louisiana
Sportspeople from Lexington, Kentucky
American male boxers
Super-middleweight boxers